Sally Rodd (born 10 December 1956) is an Australian alpine skier. She competed in three events at the 1976 Winter Olympics.

References

1956 births
Living people
Australian female alpine skiers
Olympic alpine skiers of Australia
Alpine skiers at the 1976 Winter Olympics
Place of birth missing (living people)